List of Colonial Heads of Mali

(Dates in italics indicate de facto continuation of office)

{|class="wikitable"
Term
Incumbent
Notes
|-
|colspan=3|French Suzerainty
|-
|-
|27 February 1880 to 29 July 1880||Charles Émile Boilèv, Commandant-Superior ||1st Term
|-
|colspan="3"|Haut-Sénégal (French territory of Upper Senegal)  under Senegal
|-
|6 September 1880 to 3 September 1883||Gustave Borgnis-Desbordes, Commandant-Superior
|-
|3 September 1883 to 18 June 1884||Charles Émile Boilève, Commandant-Superior ||2nd Term
|-
|18 June 1884 to 4 September 1884||Antoine Vincent Auguste Combes, acting Commandant-Superior
|-
|4 September 1884 to September 1885||Antoine Vincent Auguste Combes, Commandant-Superior
|-
|September 1885 to August 1886||Henri Nicolas Frey, Commandant-Superior
|-
|August 1886 to 10 September 1888||Joseph Simon Galliéni, Commandant-Superior
|-
|10 September 1888 to 18 August 1890||Louis Archinard, Commandant-Superior||1st Term
|-
|colspan="3"|French Sudan Territory
|-
|18 August 1890 to 1891||Louis Archinard, Commandant-Superior||1st Term (contd.)
|-
|1891 to 27 August 1892||Pierre Maire Gustave Hubert, Commandant-Superior
|-
|colspan="2"|separate colony
|-
|27 August 1892 to 2 August 1893||Louis Archinard, Commandant-Superior ||2nd Term
|-
|2 August 1893 to 26 December 1893||Eugène Bonnier, acting Commandant-Superior
|-
|26 December 1893 to 16 June 1895||Louis Albert Grodet, Governor
|-
|colspan="2"|Incorporated into French West Africa
|-
|16 June 1895 to 1898||Louis Edgard de Trentinian, Governor
|-
|1898 to 17 October 1899||Marie Michel Alexandre René Audéoud, acting Governor
|-
|colspan="2"|Dissolution of French Sudan
|-
|17 October 1899 to 10 October 1902||William Merlaud-Ponty, Delegate
|-
|colspan="3"|Senegambia and Niger Colony
|-
|10 October 1902 to 18 October 1904||William Merlaud-Ponty, Delegate
|-
|colspan="3"|Haut-Sénégal-Niger (Upper Senegal and Niger)
|-
|18 October 1904 to 20 October 1904||William Merlaud-Ponty, Delegate
|-
|20 October 1904 to 18 February 1908||William Merlaud-Ponty, Lieutenant-Governor
|-
|18 February 1908 to 16 June 1915||François Joseph Clozel, Lieutenant-Governor
|-
|16 June 1915 to 1 July 1915||Philippe Henry, acting Lieutenant-Governor
|-
|1 July 1915 to 28 July 1916||Louis Digue, acting Lieutenant-Governor
|-
|28 July 1916 to 20 April 1917||Raphaël Antonetti, acting Lieutenant-Governor
|-
|20 April 1917 to 21 May 1917||Albert Nebout, acting Lieutenant-Governor
|-
|21 May 1917 to 20 February 1918||Louis Periquet, acting Lieutenant-Governor
|-
|20 February 1918 to 16 May 1919||Auguste Brunet, Lieutenant-Governor
|-
|16 May 1919 to 4 December 1920||Marcel Achille Olivier, Lieutenant-Governor
|-
|colspan="3"|French Sudan
|-
|4 December 1920 to 21 August 1921||Marcel Achille Olivier, Lieutenant-Governor
|-
|21 August 1921 to 26 February 1924||Jean Henri Terrasson de Fougères, acting Governor
|-
|26 February 1924 to 31 December 1930||Jean Henri Terrasson de Fougères, Governor
|-
|31 December 1930 to 4 April 1931||Joseph Urbain Court, acting Governor
|-
|4 April 1931 to 11 June 1931||Gabriel Omar Descemet, acting Governor
|-
|11 June 1931 to 31 March 1933||Louis Jacques Eugène Fousset, acting Governor ||1st Term
|-
|31 March 1933 to 22 May 1933||René Desjardins, acting Governor
|-
|22 May 1933 to 30 November 1933||Léon Solomiac, acting Governor
|-
|30 November 1933 to 19 February 1935||Louis Jacques Eugène Fousset, Governor||2nd Term
|-
|19 February 1935 to 22 November 1935||Félix Sylvestre Adolphe Éboué, acting Governor
|-
|22 November 1935 to 9 November 1936||Matteo-Mathieu-Maurice Alfassa, Governor
|-
|9 November 1936 to 4 December 1936||Ferdinand Jacques Louis Rougier, acting Governor
|-
|4 December 1936 to 28 March 1938||Ferdinand Jacques Louis Rougier, Governor
|-
||28 March 1938 to 15 November 1940||Jean Desanti, acting Governor
|-
|15 November 1940 to 17 April 1942||Jean Desanti, Governor
|-
|17 April 1942 to 29 December 1942||Auguste Calvel, acting Governor
|-
|29 December 1942 to 15 May 1946||Auguste Calvel, Governor
|-
|15 May 1946 to 27 October 1946||Edmond Louveau, Governor 
|-
|French Sudan||French overseas territory
|-
|27 October 1946 to April 1952||Edmond Louveau, Governor
|-
|April 1952 to 10 July 1952||Camille Victor Bailly, Governor
|-
|10 July 1952 to 23 February 1953||Salvador Jean Etchéber, acting Governor
|-
|23 February 1953 to 2 December 1953||Albert Jean Mouragues, Governor
|-
|2 December 1953 to 10 February 1954||Lucien Eugène Geay, acting Governor
|-
|10 February 1954 to 3 November 1956||Lucien Eugène Geay, Governor
|-
|3 November 1956 to 24 November 1958||Henri Victor Gipoulon, High Commissioner
|-
|Sudanese Republic||autonomous 
|-
|24 November 1958 to 4 April 1959||Jean Charles Sicurani, High Commissioner
|-
|Mali Federation||union of Sudanese Republic and Senegal
|-
|4 April 1959 to 20 June 1960||Jean Charles Sicurani, High Commissioner
|-
|20 June 1960||Independence as Mali Federation
|}

For continuation after independence, see: Heads of State of Mali

See also
History of Mali

Mali history-related lists
List
Mali
Political history of Mali